The Cannonball House in Saint Michaels, Maryland, United States, is a historic house built in the early 19th century.  The Federal style house is a side-hall double-parlor design on a corner lot, built for shipbuilder William Merchant. It is historically notable for an 1813 event in the War of 1812 in which the British fleet bombarded Saint Michaels, leaving a cannonball embedded in the house.

Cannonball House was listed on the National Register of Historic Places in 1983.

References

External links
, including photo dated 1980, at Maryland Historical Trust

Houses in Talbot County, Maryland
Houses on the National Register of Historic Places in Maryland
Houses completed in 1810
Saint Michaels, Maryland
National Register of Historic Places in Talbot County, Maryland